The Mantua Township School District is a community public school district that serves students in pre-kindergarten through sixth grade from Mantua Township, in Gloucester County, New Jersey, United States.

As of the 2020–21 school year, the district, comprised of three schools, had an enrollment of 1,200 students and 121.4 classroom teachers (on an FTE basis), for a student–teacher ratio of 9.9:1.

The district is classified by the New Jersey Department of Education as being in District Factor Group "FG", the fourth-highest of eight groupings. District Factor Groups organize districts statewide to allow comparison by common socioeconomic characteristics of the local districts. From lowest socioeconomic status to highest, the categories are A, B, CD, DE, FG, GH, I and J.

Public school students in seventh through twelfth grades attend the schools of the Clearview Regional High School District, which serves students from Harrison Township and Mantua Township. Schools in the district (with 2020–21 enrollment data from the National Center for Education Statistics) are 
Clearview Regional Middle School with 788 students (grades 7 and 8) and 
Clearview Regional High School with 1,485 students (grades 9-12). Seats on the high school district's nine-member board are allocated based on population, with five seats assigned to Mantua Township.

History
Students in grades 7-12 from Mantua Township had attended Pitman High School as part of a sending/receiving relationship until Clearview Regional High School opened for the 1960-61 school year.

Schools
Schools in the district (with 2020–21 enrollment data from the National Center for Education Statistics) are:
Sewell School with 282 students in pre-kindergarten through Kindergarten
Katelyn Donocoff, Principal
Centre City School with 441 students in grades 1-3
Jennifer Cavalieri, Principal
J. Mason Tomlin School with 477 students in grades 4-6
Chantelle C. Shorter, Principal

Administration
Core members of the district's administration are:
Christine R. Trampé, Superintendent
Steven Crispin, Business Administrator
Michelle Daminger, Board Secretary

Board of education
The district's board of education, comprised of nine members, sets policy and oversees the fiscal and educational operation of the district through its administration. As a Type II school district, the board's trustees are elected directly by voters to serve three-year terms of office on a staggered basis, with three seats up for election each year held (since 2012) as part of the November general election. The board appoints a superintendent to oversee the district's day-to-day operations and a business administrator to supervise the business functions of the district.

References

External links
Mantua Township School District

School Data for the Mantua Township School District, National Center for Education Statistics
Clearview Regional High School District

Mantua Township, New Jersey
New Jersey District Factor Group FG
School districts in Gloucester County, New Jersey